Henbury is a village and civil parish in the unitary authority of Cheshire East and the ceremonial county of Cheshire, England. According to the 2001 census, the entire civil parish had a population of 594.

Henbury became a civil parish in 1845. It has an Anglican church, the Church of St  Thomas, two pubs, and a grocery.

The village hall hosts a number of functions throughout the year with an active social committee. There is also a Millennium Green in Henbury.

See also

Website for Henbury, Cheshire
Listed buildings in Henbury, Cheshire
Henbury Hall, Cheshire

Notes and references

External links

Villages in Cheshire
Civil parishes in Cheshire
Towns and villages of the Peak District